The 2010 Casino Rama Curling Skins Game on TSN was held on January 16 and 17 at the Casino Rama Entertainment Centre in Rama, Ontario.  The total purse for the event was CAD$100,000.

Four teams were invited to participate. They played one semi-final each on January 16, with the winners playing in the final on January 17.

Teams

Team Ferbey
Saville Sports Centre, Edmonton, Alberta

Fourth: Wayne Middaugh (in place for David Nedohin)
Skip: Randy Ferbey
Second: Scott Pfeifer
Lead: Marcel Rocque

Team Howard
Coldwater and District Curling Club, Coldwater, Ontario

Skip: Glenn Howard
Third: Richard Hart
Second: Brent Laing
Lead: Craig Savill

Team Martin
Saville Sports Centre, Edmonton, Alberta

Skip: Kevin Martin
Third: John Morris
Second: Marc Kennedy
Lead: Ben Hebert

Team Murdoch
Lockerbie Curling Club, Lockerbie, Scotland

Skip: David Murdoch
Third: Ewan MacDonald
Second: Pete Smith
Lead: Euan Byers

Draw to the button
Kevin Martin won the Draw Shot Challenge, receiving a bonus of $1,000.

Games
Semi-final dollar amounts
1st & 2nd end: $1000
3rd & 4th end: $1500
5th end: $2000
6th end: $3000
7th end: $4500
8th end: $6500

Ferbey vs. Howard
January 16, 1:00pm EST

Martin vs. Murdoch
January 16, 8:00pm EST

Final
January 17, 1:00pm EST

Final game dollar amounts
1st & 2nd end: $2000
3rd & 4th end: $3000
5th end: $4000
6th end: $6000
7th end: $9000
8th end: $13000
+ $15000 bonus for the winner

Casino Rama Curling Skins Game
TSN Skins Game
2010 in Ontario
Curling in Ontario